James Blake was the defending champion and successfully defended his title, beating Jarkko Nieminen 6–4, 6–2 in the final.

Seeds

Draw

Finals

Top half

Bottom half

External links
 Main draw
 Qualifying draw 

2006 ATP Tour
2006 Stockholm Open